Trinity Common Terminal is a Brampton Transit operated bus station serving the northeast area of Brampton, Ontario, Canada. Located centrally within Trinity Common Mall, this terminal has an office that sells Presto There are no public washrooms in this terminal.

Bus routes

Brampton Transit 
 5/5A Bovaird
 17 Howden
 18B Dixie
 21 Heart Lake 
 23 Sandalwood 
 32 Father Tobin
 33 Peter Robertson

Züm
 505 Züm Bovaird

GO Transit 

 32 Brampton Trinity Common GO Bus

References

Brampton Transit
Bus stations in Ontario
Transport infrastructure completed in 1999
1999 establishments in Ontario